Andrew Purcell (born ) is a former Scotland international rugby league footballer who played as a  or  in the 1990s and 2000s. He played at representative level for Scotland, and at club level for the Swinton Lions, Illawarra Steelers, Hull FC and the Castleford Tigers (Heritage No. 764).

Playing career
Purcell played at the 2000 Rugby League World Cup.

References

External links
The Teams: Scotland
Statistics at rugbyleagueproject.org

1971 births
Living people
Australian people of Scottish descent
Australian rugby league players
Castleford Tigers players
Hull F.C. players
Illawarra Steelers players
Place of birth missing (living people)
Rugby league five-eighths
Rugby league hookers
Rugby league locks
Rugby league props
Rugby league second-rows
Scotland national rugby league team captains
Scotland national rugby league team players
Swinton Lions players